Art of the Trio 4: Back at the Vanguard is a live album by American pianist and composer Brad Mehldau released on the Warner Bros. label in 1999.

Reception

AllMusic awarded the album 4½ stars and in its review by Stephen Thomas Erlewine, he states "as this exceptional album proves, there is considerable emotion and feeling and plain excitement behind his music, even during the mesmerizing quiet sections". On All About Jazz, John Sharpe noted "Mehldau and his trio have changed and evolved since his early recordings and have now established their own, unique voice". JazzTimes reviewer, Josef Woodard commented "It's a live affair in more ways than one, full of the detours and shameless explorations on-the-fly that Mehldau is wont to make in the course of jazz duty. Mehldau's debt to the re-inventive impulse, and the classical instincts, in Keith Jarrett's playing are still identifiable, but his personal voice keeps emerging afresh".

Track listing 
All compositions by Brad Mehldau except as indicated
 "All the Things You Are" (Oscar Hammerstein II, Jerome Kern) - 13:44
 "Sehnsucht" - 10:48
 "Nice Pass" - 17:35
 "Solar" (Miles Davis) - 9:54
 "London Blues" - 7:37
 "I'll Be Seeing You" (Sammy Fain, Irving Kahal) - 7:17
 "Exit Music (For a Film)" (Radiohead) - 8:53

Personnel 
Brad Mehldau - Piano
Larry Grenadier - Bass 
Jorge Rossy - Drums

Credits 
Produced by Matt Pierson
Recorded by David Oakes 
Mixing by James Farber
Mastering by Mark Wilder 
Art Direction and Design by Lawrence Azerrad 
Photography by John Clark

References 

Warner Records live albums
Brad Mehldau live albums
1999 live albums
Albums recorded at the Village Vanguard
Albums produced by Matt Pierson